Woy Woy railway station is located on the Main Northern line in New South Wales, Australia. It serves the southern Central Coast suburb of Woy Woy opening on 1 February 1889.

Platforms & services
Woy Woy has one island platform with two faces. It is serviced by NSW TrainLink Central Coast & Newcastle Line services travelling from Sydney Central to Newcastle. Peak-hour services travel from Central to Wyong via the North Shore line.

There are two crossovers south of the station, allowing trains to terminate in an emergency. They cannot be used for regular working as they are manually operated by levers next to the tracks and there are no signals to permit any movements over the points. All signals at this station are controlled from Cowan or Gosford.

Transport links

The station is serviced by bus services operated by Busways.

Stand 1
55: to Gosford station
70: to Gosford Hospital

Stand 2
50: to Umina South
55: to Umina Beach and Ettalong Beach

Stand 3
53: to Ettalong Beach & Booker Bay
70: to Ettalong Beach

Stand 4
59: to Empire Bay & Wagstaffe
64: to Kincumber & Erina Fair

Stand 5
54: to Pearl Beach & Patonga
57: to Umina West & Castle Circuit
58: to Woy Woy Bay

References

External links

Woy Woy station details Transport for New South Wales
Woy Woy Station Public Transport Map Transport for NSW

Transport on the Central Coast (New South Wales)
Easy Access railway stations in New South Wales
Railway stations in Australia opened in 1889
Regional railway stations in New South Wales
Main North railway line, New South Wales
Central Coast Council (New South Wales)